Kick Up the Fire, and Let the Flames Break Loose is the second album from the British alternative rock band, The Cooper Temple Clause, released on 8 September 2003 in the UK by Morning Records, and on 24 February 2004 in the U.S. by RCA.

It was released on CD and vinyl, including a limited edition with bonus DVD, a Japanese edition and an album sampler. Some CD releases of the album feature Copy Control protection.

The title is a quotation from a poem by Philip Larkin.

The album charted at #5 in the UK charts and dropped to #41 the following week. It was however considered a big success for the band.

Track listing

CD
"The Same Mistakes" – 4:52
"Promises, Promises" – 3:26
"New Toys" – 5:26
"Talking to a Brick Wall" – 5:59
"Into My Arms" – 6:12
"Blind Pilots" 4:01
"A.I.M." – 4:58
"Music Box" – 6:28
"In Your Prime" – 2:14
"Written Apology" – 10:10

The Japanese version includes "I Know" as a bonus song.

Bonus DVD
Bonus DVD video tracks (1–6), audio tracks (7–10):

 "Promises, Promises"
 "Making Promises, Promises"
 "Let's Kill Music"
 "Film-Maker"
 "Been Training Dogs"
 "Who Needs Enemies?"
 "Promises, Promises" (live)
 "Blind Pilots" (live)
 "The Same Mistakes" (live)
 "A.I.M." (live)

Album Sampler
 "The Same Mistakes"
 "Promises, Promises"
 "Blind Pilots"
 "New Toys"
 "Music Box"

References 

2003 albums
The Cooper Temple Clause albums
Albums produced by Dan Austin